General elections were held in Belgium on 7 November 1971. The result was a victory for the Christian People's Party, which won 40 of the 212 seats in the Chamber of Representatives and 34 of the 106 seats in the Senate. Voter turnout was 91.5%. Elections to the nine provincial councils were also held.

The linguistic issues led to the splitting of the major parties into separate Flemish and Francophone parties. Consequently the election returned a very fragmented parliament.

The election followed the first state reform, with the creation of three cultural communities. The newly elected members of parliament would thus also serve in the newly established cultural councils.

Results

Chamber of Representatives

Senate

References

1971 elections in Belgium
November 1971 events in Europe